St. Francis Church is a newly built church located on Saadiyat Island in Abu Dhabi, United Arab Emirates. The Church is part of the Abrahamic Family House, an interfaith complex that includes a mosque, a synagogue and a church, built with the aim of promoting interfaith harmony and understanding.

History 
The St. Francis Church was built as part of the Abrahamic Family House project, initiated by His Highness Sheikh Mohammed Bin Zayed Al Nahyan, (then Crown Prince of Abu Dhabi and Deputy Supreme Commander of the UAE Armed Forces) President of the United Arab Emirates and Ruler of Abu Dhabi. The project was launched in 2019 and aims to promote interfaith harmony and understanding among the followers of the Abrahamic religions.

The church is dedicated to St. Francis of Assisi, the patron saint of animals and the environment. St. Francis is known for his devotion to peace, love, and compassion towards all living beings.

It was officially inaugurated on 16 February 2023 by Lt. General Sheikh Saif bin Zayed Al Nahyan, Deputy Prime Minister and Minister of the Interior, and Sheikh Nahyan bin Mubarak Al Nahyan, Minister of Tolerance and Coexistence.

On 19 February 2023, a solemn thanksgiving prayer service was conducted at the St. Francis Church, which was the first prayer service held at the Church. His Eminence Cardinal Michael L. Fitzgerald, the representative of Pope Francis, delivered his address at the ceremony.

Msgr. Yoannis Lahzi Gaid, a member of the Higher Committee of Human Fraternity, welcomed everyone at the church. His Excellency Bishop Paolo Martinelli, the Apostolic Vicar of Southern Arabia, His Excellency Bishop Paul Hinder, the Apostolic Vicar Emeritus and Msgr. Kryspin Dubiel, the Charge D’Affaires of the Apostolic Nunciature in the United Arab Emirates were present along with other dignitaries, clergy and lay representatives.

Conveying the greetings of the Pope, Cardinal Fitzgerald said at the prayer service, "He would also encourage all of us, gathered here today, to continue in the culture of dialogue as our path; to adopt mutual cooperation as our code of conduct; and to endeavor to make reciprocal understanding the constant method of our undertakings."

Bishop Paolo Martinelli concluded the service with his thanksgiving speech, in which he thanked everyone who was present at the event. He thanked the rulers of the United Arab Emirates, especially His Highness Sheikh Mohammed Bin Zayed Al Nahyan, for his vision for this House, Mr. Abdulla Al Shehhi, the Director of the Abrahamic Family house and Sir David Adjaye, the architect who designed and built the House.

The church faces the direction of the rising sun, as light is considered symbolic of divinity. Its forest of columns is orientated in this direction to maximise the eastern light and emphasises verticality to express the concepts of incarnation (or descent) and resurrection (or ascent) that are central to the Christian faith. The timber battens are inspired by rays of light and reference the altar at St. Peter's Basilica in the Vatican. More than 13,000 linear metres of timber form the church's vaulting.

See also 

 Abrahamic Family House
 Document on Human Fraternity

External links 

 Official website
 First Prayer Service
 Address of Cardinal Michael L. Fitzgerald
 Thanksgiving speech by Bishop Paolo Martinell

References 

Religion in Abu Dhabi
Buildings and structures in Abu Dhabi
Apostolic Vicariate of Southern Arabia
Abrahamic Family House
Catholic Church in the Arabian Peninsula
Roman Catholic churches in the United Arab Emirates